Lucas Spinola Salinas (born 14 October 1995), known as Lucas Salinas, is a Brazilian professional footballer who plays as a midfielder for F.C. Ashdod in the Israeli Premier League. He also holds Spanish citizenship.

Club career
Salinas made his professional debut in the Campeonato Paulista for São Bento on 26 March 2015 in a game against Bragantino. In February 2020 he joined Bulgarian club Lokomotiv Plovdiv on a two-and-a-half-year contract.

Honours
Lokomotiv Plovdiv
 Bulgarian Cup: 2019–20
 Bulgarian Supercup: 2020

References

External links

1995 births
Living people
People from Sorocaba
Brazilian footballers
Association football midfielders
Esporte Clube São Bento players
Clube Atlético Sorocaba players
Lusitano F.C. (Portugal) players
C.F. Os Armacenenses players
S.C. Olhanense players
Sertanense F.C. players
PFC Lokomotiv Plovdiv players
F.C. Ashdod players
Campeonato de Portugal (league) players
First Professional Football League (Bulgaria) players
Israeli Premier League players
Brazilian expatriate footballers
Expatriate footballers in Portugal
Expatriate footballers in Bulgaria
Expatriate footballers in Israel
Brazilian expatriate sportspeople in Portugal
Brazilian expatriate sportspeople in Bulgaria
Brazilian expatriate sportspeople in Israel
Brazilian people of Spanish descent
Footballers from São Paulo (state)